Liow Cai Tung is a Malaysian politician. She is the Member of Johor State Legislative Assembly for Johor Jaya since 2013 after winning the 2013 Malaysian state election and 2018 Johor state election. She was a Johor State Executive Councillor for Tourism, Woman Development, Family and Community.

Election results

References 

Living people
People from Johor
Malaysian people of Hakka descent
Democratic Action Party (Malaysia) politicians
21st-century Malaysian politicians
Members of the Johor State Legislative Assembly
Johor state executive councillors
1986 births